Substance-K receptor is a protein that in humans is encoded by the TACR2 gene.

Function 

This gene belongs to a family of genes that function as receptors for tachykinins.  Receptor affinities are specified by variations in the 5'-end of the sequence.  The receptors belonging to this family are characterized by interactions with G proteins and 7 hydrophobic transmembrane regions.  This gene encodes the receptor for the tachykinin neuropeptide substance K, also referred to as neurokinin A.

Selective Ligands
Several selective ligands for NK2 are now available, and although most of the compounds developed so far are peptides, one small-molecule antagonist Saredutant is currently in clinical trials as an anxiolytic and antidepressant.

Agonists
 GR-64349 - potent and selective agonist, EC50 3.7nM, 7-amino acid polypeptide chain. CAS# 137593-52-3

Antagonists
 Ibodutant - failed its Phase 3 trial for IBS treatment in 2015, and abandoned by Menarini
 Saredutant - mixed but mostly negative Phase 3 trial results in 2009, and abandoned by Sanofi-Aventis
 GR-159897 
 MEN-10376 - potent and selective antagonist, 7-amino acid polypeptide chain. CAS# 135306-85-3

See also 
 Tachykinin receptor

References

Further reading

External links 
 

G protein-coupled receptors